The 2019 IAAF Road Race Label Events are the twelfth edition of the global series of road running competitions given Label status by the International Association of Athletics Federations (IAAF). The series included a total of 138 road races: 64 Gold Label, 25 Silver Label and 49 Bronze Label. In terms of distance, 88 races were marathons, 28 were half marathons, 15 were 10K runs, and 7 were held over other distances. The series included all six World Marathon Majors in the Gold category.

Races

References

Race calendar and results
Calendar 2019 IAAF Label Road Races. IAAF. Retrieved 2019-09-22.

2019
IAAF Road Race Label Events